Dolichol monophosphate is a fatty alcohol.

See also
 Dolichyl-phosphatase
 Dolichyl-phosphate beta-D-mannosyltransferase
 DPM1

Organophosphates